Provincial Road 373 (also known as Highway 373 or PR 373) is a highly recognized all-weather provincial road in Division 22 of Manitoba. The road was made famous by a group of singers from Norway House, who named their band Highway 373. PR 373 begins at an intersection with Highway 6 in Setting Lake, heads eastward through rural regions, and terminating at an intersection with local roads in Norway House. There is one major intersection along the way, Road 374, which heads north to Cross Lake. PR 373's entire length is declared a class A1 provincial road.

Route description
PR 373 begins at an intersection with PTH 6 near Setting Lake. The route immediately crosses the Canadian National Railway as a two-lane dirt road, passing south of Resting Lake. PR 373 runs east and northeast for several miles, passing a dirt road connection to Diamond Lake. The route makes a gradual bend to the southeast, passing Mustoe Lake and another dirt connection to Duck Lake. PR 373 bends southwest along a straight right-of-way, making a bend from a far distance around Tippett Lake before reaching the community of Jenpeg.

PR 373 runs through Jenpeg on a northeast right-of-way, crossing the northern end of Jenpeg Airport and south of the local dam. Making a bend to the southeast, PR 373 crosses the Nelson River and winds out of Jenpeg along the Nelson River. At the shores of Kiskittogisu Lake, the route reaches a junction with PR 374, which is a spur to Cross Lake and the Cross Lake First Nation. Also present at this junction is a spur to the lake. The route runs southeast for  before reaching the Nelson River once again.

PR 373 at the Nelson River is in the Norway House First Nation, which requires a ferry to cross the river. The route runs southwest along the Nelson River, passing a road that connects to another section of the First Nation. Near Hope Island, the route enters the Norway House First Nation once again, reaching Rossville near Hilton Lake. In Rossville, there's a connection to the Wasagamack and the St. Theresa Point nations. Crossing the Nelson River, PR 373 turns westward and crosses onto Fort Island. The route winds westward along the northern shore of the island and into downtown Norway House, reaching a junction with local streets in front of the Norway House Health Center. The right-of-way continues west as Lake Road to the shore of Little Playgreen Lake.

History
PR 373 was first designated as a provincial highway from PR 391 near Pipun and the Canadian National Railway to the shores of Diamond Lake. At the same time, construction began on the Jenpeg Generating Station, which cost $310 million (1979 CAD). The next year, a spur of PR 373 was graded southeast of Wabowden and connected to the future site of the community of Jenpeg and the generating station. This also remained the same until 1978, when the road was extended across Ross Island and into downtown Norway House. The generation station at Jenpeg was completed in 1979. PR 373 remained the same length before being extended in 1986 to Norway House. A section to Diamond Lake was removed from the designation, but remained a gravel road. A spur to Cross Lake was also constructed. By 1989, the western terminus had been replaced by PTH 6, which was extended over PR 391. In 1994, PR 374 was designated on this spur to Cross Lake.

Junction list

References

External links
Provincial Trunk Highway and Provincial Road Locations - Government of Manitoba

373